Greenhouse may refer to:

Greenhouse, an indoor covered place where plants are grown and cultivated
Greenhouse effect, the effects on a planet when 'greenhouse gases' cloud the atmosphere
Greenhouse and icehouse Earth, periods when the greenhouse effect is dominant or absent
Greenhouse effect (United States Supreme Court), postulated effect whereby conservative Supreme Court Justices drift liberal for favorable press
Greenhouse debt, the measure to which an entity exceeds its permitted greenhouse footprint

Name 
Greenhouse (surname)

Music 
Greenhouse (Leo Kottke album), an album by Leo Kottke released in 1973
Greenhouse (Brotherhood of Man album), a 1997 album by Brotherhood of Man
Greenhouse (Yellowjackets album), 1991
Greenhouse Music, a record label
Greenhouse Studios, a music recording facility in Vancouver, Canada
Greenhouse (music group), also known as Greenhouse Effect, an American hip hop duo

Other 
Operation Greenhouse, a 1951 series of nuclear tests
Greenhouse (automotive), an automotive term
Greenhouse Software, a technology company that provides a recruiting software as a service
Greenhouse (restaurant), in Perth, Western Australia
 The Greenhouse (novel), a novel by Susan Hillmore
 Nash Block, also known as The Greenhouse, a building in Omaha, Nebraska
 The Greenhouse (TV series)

See also
Green House (disambiguation)
Greene House (disambiguation)
Hothouse (disambiguation)